The Trifid Nebula (catalogued as Messier 20 or M20 and as NGC 6514) is an H II region in the north-west of Sagittarius in a star-forming region in the Milky Way's Scutum-Centaurus Arm. It was discovered by Charles Messier on June 5, 1764. Its name means 'three-lobe'. The object is an unusual combination of an open cluster of stars, an emission nebula (the relatively dense, reddish-pink portion), a reflection nebula (the mainly NNE blue portion), and a dark nebula (the apparent 'gaps' in the former that cause the trifurcated appearance, also designated Barnard 85). Viewed through a small telescope, the Trifid Nebula is a bright and peculiar object, and is thus a perennial favorite of amateur astronomers.

The most massive star that has formed in this region is HD 164492A, an O7.5III star with a mass more than 20 times the mass of the Sun.
This star is surrounded by a cluster of approximately 3100 young stars.

Characteristics
The Trifid Nebula was the subject of an investigation by astronomers using the Hubble Space Telescope in 1997, using filters that isolate emission from hydrogen atoms, ionized sulfur atoms, and doubly ionized oxygen atoms. The images were combined into a false-color composite picture to suggest how the nebula might look to the eye.

The close-up images show a dense cloud of dust and gas, which is a stellar nursery full of embryonic stars. This cloud is about
 away from the nebula's central star. The jet's source is a young stellar object deep within the cloud. Jets are the exhaust gasses of star formation and radiation from the nebula's central star makes the jet glow.

The images also showed a finger-like stalk to the right of the jet. It points from the head of the dense cloud directly toward the star that powers the Trifid nebula. This stalk is a prominent example of evaporating gaseous globules, or 'EGGs'. The stalk has survived because its tip is a knot of gas that is dense enough to resist being eaten away by the powerful radiation from the star.

In January 2005, NASA's Spitzer Space Telescope discovered 30 embryonic stars and 120 newborn stars not seen in visible light images.

Its apparent magnitude is 6.3.

Details and features

See also
 List of Messier objects
 List of nebulae
 Messier object
 New General Catalogue
 Wikipedia Project: Astronomical Objects
 Islands (King Crimson album), which uses an image of the nebula as its cover

References

External links

 Spitzer IR Trifid discoveries 
 Messier 20, SEDS Messier pages
 Trifid Nebula at ESA/Hubble
 
 
 Trifid Nebula at Constellation Guide

Carina–Sagittarius Arm
H II regions
Messier objects
NGC objects
Sagittarius (constellation)
17640605
Articles containing video clips
Star-forming regions